The Faint is an American indie rock band. Formed in Omaha, Nebraska, the band consists of Todd Fink, Graham Ulicny, Dapose and Clark Baechle. The Faint was originally known as Norman Bailer and included Conor Oberst (of Bright Eyes, with whom The Faint toured in 2005). He quit shortly after the band was formed, though the Faint continued to share a spot with Bright Eyes on Saddle Creek Records.

History
Growing up, Fink, Petersen, and Baechle skateboarded in their free time, until Fink developed knee problems, which shifted their hobbies towards making music. The band originally consisted of Clark Baechle, Todd Fink (formerly Todd Baechle), and Joel Petersen. They signed to Saddle Creek Records and released a few singles, but were unable to establish widespread sales. After adding Matt Bowen, the Faint released Media. At the end of 1998, Jacob Thiele joined the band, and shortly thereafter, Matt Bowen was replaced by Ethan Jones. They toured the U.S., playing what would become the songs that would comprise the next album, Blank-Wave Arcade, which had a more dance and techno influenced sound and was an underground hit. Before recording the album, however, Jones left the band and was replaced on bass guitar by Joel Petersen, who played both bass and guitar on the album.  Partway through the creation of Danse Macabre, the Faint added Dapose, a death metal guitarist formerly of LEAD. Their next album, recorded with Mike Mogis and released in 2004, was called Wet from Birth. Conor Oberst claimed in an August 2020 interview with Pitchfork Magazine that The Faint were offered a major label record deal, but turned it down out of loyalty and commitment to Saddle Creek, which at the time was still a collaborative project between members of The Faint, Cursive and Bright Eyes.

In May 2008, the Faint announced that they had split from Saddle Creek, and that their fifth studio album would be self-released under their own label, blank.wav. The album, entitled Fasciinatiion, was released on August 5, 2008, in the U.S. The first single from the album was "The Geeks Were Right", which was released on Boys Noize Records. It was also announced that the band would tour North America with British electronic group Ladytron during the spring.

Since the release of Fasciinatiion, two of the band members, Clark Baechle and Todd Fink have been quietly, with little advertising, performing under the name Depressed Buttons, playing remixes of other artists, and DJing for various small clubs and venues.

The band performed an original song "Teach Me Teacher" on the children's show Yo Gabba Gabba! in the third-season episode "School", which originally aired September 19, 2010.

On October 30, 2012, Saddle Creek Records released a deluxe edition of Danse Macabre with the original album remastered, bonus and unreleased tracks, and a DVD of archival footage, live projections from that era's tour dates, and live footage. The band announced that it would play Danse Macabre in its entirety along with fan favorites during a tour of 24 cities across North America.

In 2016, Graham Ulicny (of Reptar) replaced Jacob Thiele on keyboards. Thiele died on February 13, 2020.

Band members
Todd Fink – vocals, keyboards, guitar (1995–present)
Clark Baechle – drums, percussion (1995–present)
Dapose (Michael Dappen) – guitar (2001–present)
Graham Ulicny – keyboards, vocals (2016–present)

Former members
Conor Oberst – guitar, vocals (1995)
Matt Bowen – bass, keyboards (1995–1998)
 Ethan Jones – bass (1998-1999)
Jacob Thiele – keyboards, vocals (1998–2016, died 2020)
Joel Petersen – guitar (1995–2008), bass, programming (1999-2008)

Timeline

Discography

Albums

Studio albums

Remix albums

Compilation albums

EPs

Singles

Retail singles

Promotional singles

Splits
Music Me All Over (split 7-inch) (as Norman Bailer) (Rolling Hill Records and Lumberjack)
The Faint/Ex-Action Figures (split 7-inch) (1999, Saddle Creek)

Remixes
Radio 4 - Dance to the Underground (2002 · City Slang)
Joy Electric - We Are Rock (2002 · BEC Recordings)
Yeah Yeah Yeahs - Y Control (2004 · Interscope Records / Polydor Records)
Nine Inch Nails - Meet Your Master (2007)

Compilation appearances
Nothing Left Fanzine No. 8 CD Sampler (1998)
Song: "Acting: On Campus Television"
Messages: Modern Synthpop Artists Cover OMD (2001 · Ninthwave)
Song: "Enola Gay"
Saddle Creek 50 (2002 · Saddle Creek)
Songs: "Worked Up So Sexual", "Take Me to the Hospital"
Liberation: Songs to Benefit PETA (2003 · Fat Wreck Chords)
Song: "Agenda Suicide"
Lagniappe: A Saddle Creek Benefit for Hurricane Katrina (2005 · Saddle Creek)
Song: "Hypnotised"
Injustice: Gods Among Us Soundtrack (2013 · WaterTower Music)
Song: "This Is Is Is Is Pain"

Other projects

Vverevvolf Grehv

Vverevvolf Grehv (pronounced as Werewolf Grave) is the brainchild of Dapose.  The music of Vverevvolf Grehv combines the brutality of death metal, the tempos of speed metal and the sonic decimation of noise with the complexities of electronic music genres such as snare rush and IDM.  He is influenced by Merzbow’s work, the writings of Howard Bloom, and numerous classical composers. 
Albums
Zombie Aesthetics - Relapse Records 2008

Broken Spindles

Broken Spindles was a band solely consisting of Joel Petersen of Omaha, Nebraska, who also played bass, guitar and keyboards in The Faint. The music of Broken Spindles ranged from instrumental electronic songs to sparse piano pieces to rock-influenced pop songs. Broken Spindles originally started in 2001 as the soundtrack for a friend's film.

See also
Broken Spindles

References

External links
 The Faint on FreeIndie
 

Conor Oberst
Indie rock musical groups from Nebraska
Post-punk revival music groups
Musical groups from Omaha, Nebraska
Remixers
Astralwerks artists
Saddle Creek Records artists
1995 establishments in Nebraska